Ptilodegeeria is a genus of flies in the family Tachinidae.

Species
Ptilodegeeria lindigi Townsend, 1931
Ptilodegeeria umbrifera (Walker, 1853)

References

Diptera of South America
Exoristinae
Tachinidae genera
Taxa named by Friedrich Moritz Brauer
Taxa named by Julius von Bergenstamm